Ust-Yansk (Usuyaana) is a rural locality (a selo), the only inhabited locality, and the administrative center of Ust-Yansky Rural Okrug of Ust-Yansky District in the Sakha Republic, Russia, located  from Deputatsky, the administrative center of the district. Its population as of the 2010 Census was 317, down from 341 recorded during the 2002 Census.

References

Notes

Sources
Official website of the Sakha Republic. Registry of the Administrative-Territorial Divisions of the Sakha Republic. Ust-Yansky District. 

Rural localities in Ust-Yansky District
Yana basin